is a private university in Hiroshima city, Japan, established in 1967.

See also

FM Ham-star

External links
 Official website 

Educational institutions established in 1967
Private universities and colleges in Japan
Universities and colleges in Hiroshima Prefecture